Earl L. Holmes (born April 28, 1973) is a former American football linebacker and former head coach at Florida A&M University. He was drafted by the Pittsburgh Steelers in the 4th round of the 1996 NFL Draft 126th overall out of Florida A&M University. Holmes was inducted into the FAMU Hall of Fame in July 2005 to join the likes of Alonzo S. "Jake" Gaither and FAMU'S "Famed Final Four of 1952."

Playing career
Holmes, Florida A&M- Holmes played for the Rattlers from 1992 to 1995, finishing as the school's all-time leader in tackles.  Holmes, a three-time All-MEAC First-team selection, holds the school and MEAC record with 509 total tackles (309 solo).
During his senior season, he set school marks for solo tackles (103) and total tackles (171).Holmes had a single game career high against Southern University in the Atlanta Classic where he tallied (30) tackles.   He captured the NCAA Division I-AA and Black College All-American honors in 1994 and 1995. The 1995 MEAC Defensive Player of the Year and Sheridan Broadcasting Network College Defensive Player of the Year, Holmes was selected in the fourth round of the 1996 National Football League (NFL) draft by the Pittsburgh Steelers.
 
In his NFL career, Holmes played for the Steelers, Cleveland Browns, and Detroit Lions. Holmes, listed at 6'2' 242 lbs, garnered a reputation as a solid run stopping Middle Linebacker. He played his first 6 seasons in Pittsburgh where he totaled 547 tackles (392 solo), 9.5 sacks, an unhealthy 56 tackles for loss, 3 forced fumbles, 4 fumbles recovered, 21 pass deflections, and 1 interception for 36 yards in 81 games. In 2002 Holmes signed a free agent deal with the Cleveland Browns. He had one of his best seasons of his career by totaling 128 tackles (96 solo), 8.5 tackles for loss, 1 forced fumble, 1 fumble recovery, and 5 pass deflections in leading the Browns to a playoff berth. Holmes finished his career with three solid seasons for the Detroit Lions. He played 10 seasons in the NFL as a member of the Steelers (1996-2001), Cleveland Browns (2002) and Detroit Lions (2003-05) before retiring.

In his 10-year career he totaled 958 tackles (685 solos), 11.5 sacks, 89 tackles for loss, 6 forced fumbles, 5 fumble recoveries, 29 pass deflections, and 1 interception for 36 yards in 140 games.

Holmes was affectionally known as "The Hit Man" by the Steelers' faithful.

Coaching career
In 2009, he returned to Florida A&M to serve on the coaching staff of Joe Taylor, eventually rising to defensive coordinator in 2012. Just before the end of the season, Taylor retired, and Holmes was named as interim head coach. On January 11, 2013, he was officially named the head coach and interim tag was removed.

He was relieved of his duties as head coach on October 28, 2014.

Head coaching record

References

External links
 

1973 births
Living people
American football middle linebackers
Cleveland Browns players
Detroit Lions players
Florida A&M Rattlers football coaches
Florida A&M Rattlers football players
Pittsburgh Steelers players
Coaches of American football from Florida
Players of American football from Tallahassee, Florida
African-American coaches of American football
African-American players of American football
20th-century African-American sportspeople
21st-century African-American sportspeople